Mary R. Habeck (born 1963) is an American scholar of international relations.  She received her PhD from Yale University and is currently Associate Professor of Strategic Studies at the Johns Hopkins University.

Fluent in Russian, she has collaborated with Ronald Radosh.

Books

 Knowing the Enemy: Jihadist Ideology and the War on Terror (2006) 
 Storm of Steel: The Development of Armor Doctrine in Germany and the Soviet Union, 1919-1939 (2003) 
 Spain Betrayed: The Soviet Union in the Spanish Civil War, co-editor (2001) 
 The Great War and the Twentieth Century, co-editor (2000)

Notes

External links
 

Living people
American women non-fiction writers
Yale University alumni
Johns Hopkins University faculty
American women academics
1963 births